The following tables list by region the nominated candidates for the 2022 Ontario general election.

Abbreviations guide
Abbreviations of political parties used in these tables:

All – Ontario Alliance
CCP – Canadians' Choice Party
Consen. – Consensus Ontario
CPO – Ontario Centrist Party
Comm. – Communist Party of Canada (Ontario)
ERP – Electoral Reform Party
FPJ – Freedom of Choice, Peace & Justice Party
FPO – Freedom Party of Ontario
Green – Green Party of Ontario
Ind. – Independent
Liberal – Ontario Liberal Party
Libert. – Ontario Libertarian Party
Mod. – Ontario Moderate Party
N. Ont – Northern Ontario Party
NB – New Blue Party of Ontario
NDP – Ontario New Democratic Party
NOTA – None of the Above Party
PPCFO – People's Progressive Common Front of Ontario
PC – Progressive Conservative Party of Ontario

PBP – Public Benefit Party of Ontario
PCRP – Ontario Provincial Confederation of Regions Party
People – The Peoples Political Party
PSN – Party for People with Special Needs
PPO – Populist Party Ontario
SNSA – Stop the New Sex-Ed Agenda
TOP – Ontario Party

Number of candidates by party

 A Liberal candidate in Parry Sound—Muskoka was deregistered from the party before May 12, 2022, due to allegations of homophobic comments. A Liberal candidate in Chatham-Kent—Leamington was deregistered from the party for past homophobic comments on social media. A replacement candidate for the Liberals in Chatham-Kent—Leamington later withdrew from the race, citing personal attacks after the NDP alleged that the candidate had been registered using the previous candidate's signatures. Additionally, the Liberals did not field a candidate in Timmins due to "a technical issue".

 One New Blue candidate in Ottawa West—Nepean was deregistered on May 17, 2022, due to Canadian military rules.

Candidates and results
† = indicates that the incumbent is not seeking re-election
‡ = indicates that the incumbent is running for re-election in a different riding
§ = represents that the incumbent was refused nomination by their party
$ = represents that the incumbent was announced as nominated by their party but later chose to retire
# = represents that the incumbent was announced as nominated by their party but later lost that party's nomination through departure or expulsion from caucus
bold indicates party leader
italics = indicates a contestant for nomination or declared interest
strikethrough indicates a candidate that has been disqualified or withdrew

Eastern Ontario

|-
| style="background:whitesmoke;"|Bay of Quinte
||
|Todd Smith
|
|Alison Kelly
|
|Emilie Leneveu
|
|Erica Charlton
|
|Rob Collins
|
|Noah Wales
|
|
||
|Todd Smith
|-
| style="background:whitesmoke;"|Glengarry—Prescott—Russell
| |
|Stéphane Sarrazin
|
|Alicia Eglin
|
|Amanda Simard
|
|Thaila Riden
|
|Victor Brassard
|
|Stéphane Aubry
|
|
||
|Amanda Simard
|-
| style="background:whitesmoke;"|Hastings—Lennox and Addington
||
|Ric Bresee
|
|Eric DePoe
|
|Ted Darby
|
|Christina Wilson
|
|Joyce Reid
|
|Derek Sloan
|
|
||
|Daryl Kramp $
|-
| style="background:whitesmoke;"|Kingston and the Islands
|
|Gary Bennett
|
|Mary Rita Holland
||
|Ted Hsu
|
|Zachary Typhair
|
|Stephen Skyvington
|
|Shalea Beckwith
|
|Laurel Claus Johnson(Consen.)Shelley Joanne Galloway (Ind.)Sebastian Vaillancourt (Comm.)
||
|Ian Arthur †
|-
| style="background:whitesmoke;"|Lanark—Frontenac—Kingston
||
|John Jordan
|
|Drew Cumpson
|
|Amanda Pulker-Mok
|
|Marlene Spruyt
|
|Marcin Lewandowski
|
|Thomas Mulder
|
|Chelsea Hillier(PPO)Craig Timothy Massey Rogers(Ind.)
||
|Randy Hillier †
|-
| style="background:whitesmoke;"|Leeds—Grenville—Thousand Islands and Rideau Lakes
||
|Steve Clark
|
|Chris Wilson
|
|Josh Bennett
|
|Fiona Jager
|
|Dan Kitsch
|
|Glenn L. Malcolm
|
|Stephen Ireland(PPCFO)Dave Senger(PPO)Mark Snow(Libert.)
||
|Steve Clark
|-
| style="background:whitesmoke;"|Renfrew—Nipissing—Pembroke
||
|John Yakabuski
|
|Kurt Stoll
|
|Oliver A. Jacob
|
|Anna Dolan
|
|Thomas O'Connor
|
|Kade MacWilliams
|
|Murray Reid(PCRP)
||
|John Yakabuski
|-
| style="background:whitesmoke;"|Stormont—Dundas—South Glengarry
||
|Nolan Quinn
|
|Wendy Stephen
|
|Kirsten J. Gardner
|
|Jacqueline Milner
|
|Claude Tardif
|
|Remi Tremblay
|
|
||
|Jim McDonell $
|}

Ottawa

|-
| style="background:whitesmoke;"|Carleton
||
|Goldie Ghamari
|
|Kevin St. Denis
|
|Tom Dawson
|
|Cody Zulinski
|
|Rob Stocki
|
|Ethan Ferguson
|
|Chris Mark Beauchamp (NOTA)
||
|Goldie Ghamari
|-
| style="background:whitesmoke;"|Kanata—Carleton
||
|Merrilee Fullerton
|
|Melissa Coenraad
|
|Shahbaz Syed
|
|Pat Freel
|
|Jennifer Boudreau
|
|Brian Chuipka
|
|
||
|Merrilee Fullerton
|-
| style="background:whitesmoke;"|Nepean
||
|Lisa MacLeod
|
|Brian Double
|
|Tyler Watt
|
|Kaitlyn Tremblay
|
|Kathleen Corriveau
|
|Bryan Emmerson
|
|
||
|Lisa MacLeod
|-
| style="background:whitesmoke;"|Orléans
|
|Melissa Felián 
|
|Gabe Bourdon
||
|Stephen Blais
|
|Michelle Petersen 
|
|Liam Randall
|
|Vince Clements
|
|Ken Lewis(Libert.)
||
|Stephen Blais
|-
| style="background:whitesmoke;"|Ottawa Centre
|
|Scott Healey
||
|Joel Harden
|
|Katie Gibbs
|
|Shelby Bertrand
|
|Glen Armstrong
|
|
|
|Marc Adornato(NOTA)Thomas Borcsok(Ind.)Josh Rachlis(Ind.)Stuart Ryan (Comm.)Raymond Samuels(PPCFO)
||
|Joel Harden
|-
| style="background:whitesmoke;"|Ottawa South
|
|Edward Dinca
|
|Morgan Gay
||
|John Fraser
|
|Nira Dookeran
|
|Martin Ince
|
|Myles Dear
|
|Daniel Thomas(Ind.)Larry Wasslen (Comm.)
||
|John Fraser
|-
| style="background:whitesmoke;"|Ottawa—Vanier
|
|Patrick Mayangi
|
|Lyra Evans
||
|Lucille Collard
|
|Christian Proulx
|
|Michael Pastien
|
|Eric Armstrong-Giroux
|
|Coreen Corcoran(Libert.)Blake Hamilton(NOTA)David McGruer(FPO)
||
|Lucille Collard
|-
| style="background:whitesmoke;"|Ottawa West—Nepean
|
|Jeremy Roberts
||
|Chandra Pasma
|
|Sam Bhalesar
|
|Steven Warren
|
|Scott Blandford
|
|Vilteau Delvas
|
|
||
|Jeremy Roberts
|}

Central Ontario

|-
| style="background:whitesmoke;"|Barrie—Innisfil
||
|Andrea Khanjin
|
|Pekka Reinio
|
|John Olthuis
|
|Bonnie North
|
|Ashlyn Steele
|
|Grace Dean
|
|Benjamin Hughes(Ind.)Jake Tucker(PPCFO)
||
|Andrea Khanjin
|-
| style="background:whitesmoke;"|Barrie—Springwater—Oro-Medonte
||
|Doug Downey
|
|Beverley Patchell
|
|Jeff Lehman
|
|Elyse Robinson
|
|Hayden Hughes
|
|Gerry Auger
|
|
||
|Doug Downey
|-
| style="background:whitesmoke;"|Bruce—Grey—Owen Sound
||
|Rick Byers
|
|Karen Gventer
|
|Selwyn J. Hicks
|
|Danielle Valiquette
|
|Vince Grimaldi
|
|Suzanne Coles 
|
|Reima Kaikkonen(Ind.)Joel Loughead(NOTA)Joseph Westover (PPO)
||
|Bill Walker $
|-
| style="background:whitesmoke;"|Dufferin—Caledon
||
|Sylvia Jones
|
|Tess Prendergast
|
|Bob Gordanier
|
|Laura Campbell
|
|Andrea Banyai
|
|Lily Nguyen
|
|Erickumar Emmanuel (Mod.)Kay Sayer (PBP)
||
|Sylvia Jones
|-
| style="background:whitesmoke;"|Haliburton—Kawartha Lakes—Brock
||
|Laurie Scott
|
|Barbara Doyle
|
|Don McBey
| 
|Tom Regina
|
|Ben Prentice
|
|Kerstin Kelly
|
|Gene Balfour(Libert.)
||
|Laurie Scott
|-
| style="background:whitesmoke;"|Northumberland—Peterborough South
||
|David Piccini
|
|Kim McArthur-Jackson
|
|Jeff Kawzenuk
|
|Lisa Francis
|
|Joshua Chalhoub 
|
|Vanessa Head
|
|
||
|David Piccini
|-
| style="background:whitesmoke;"|Peterborough—Kawartha
||
|Dave Smith
|
|Jen Deck
|
|Greg Dempsey
|
|Robert Gibson
|
|Rebecca Quinnell
|
|Tom Marazzo
|
|
||
|Dave Smith
|-
| style="background:whitesmoke;"|Simcoe—Grey
||
|Brian Saunderson
|
|Keith Nunn
|
|Ted Crysler
|
|Allan Kuhn
|
|David Ghobrial
|
|Rodney Sacrey
|
|Billy G Gordon(NOTA)
||
|Jim Wilson †
|-
| style="background:whitesmoke;"|Simcoe North
||
|Jill Dunlop
|
|Elizabeth Van Houtte
|
|Aaron Cayden Hiltz
|
|Krystal Brooks
|
|Mark Douris
|
|Aaron Macdonald
|
|William Joslin(Libert.)
||
|Jill Dunlop
|-
| style="background:whitesmoke;"|York—Simcoe
||
|Caroline Mulroney
|
|Spencer Yang Ki
|
|Walter Alvarez-Bardales
|
|Julie Stewart
|
|Brent Fellman
|
|Alana Hollander
|
|Franco Colavecchia(Mod.)Zachary Tisdale(Libert.)
||
|Caroline Mulroney
|}

905 Belt

Durham

|-
| style="background:whitesmoke;"|Ajax
||
|Patrice Barnes
|
|Christine Santos
|
|Amber Bowen
|
|Neil Runnalls
|
|Garry Reader
|
|Aaron Hopkins
|
|Intab Ali (Ind.)Allen Hadley (Ind.)
|
|Vacant
|-
| style="background:whitesmoke;"|Durham
||
|Todd McCarthy
|
|Chris Borgia
|
|Granville Anderson
|
|Mini Batra
|
|Spencer Ford
|
|Lou De Vuono
|
|Tony Stravato (Ind.)
||
|Lindsey Park #
|-
| style="background:whitesmoke;"|Oshawa
|
|Alex Down
||
|Jennifer French
|
|Catherine Mosca
|
|Katarina Dunham
|
|Daryl Janssen
|
|Dave Forsythe
|
|
||
|Jennifer French
|-
| style="background:whitesmoke;"|Pickering—Uxbridge
||
|Peter Bethlenfalvy
|
|Khalid Ahmed
|
|Ibrahim Daniyal
|
|Julia Rondinone
|
|Elizabeth Tallis
|
|Lisa Robinson
|
|Abir Dabbour (Ind.)Netalia Duboisky (Mod.)Hasan Syed (CPO)
||
|Peter Bethlenfalvy
|-
| style="background:whitesmoke;"|Whitby
||
|Lorne Coe
|
|Sara Labelle
|
|Aadil Mohammed
|
|Stephanie Leblanc
|
|Trystan Lackner
|
|Emil Labaj
|
|Christopher Rinella (Ind.)Douglas Thom (FPO)
||
|Lorne Coe
|}

Peel

|-
| style="background:whitesmoke;"|Brampton Centre
||
|Charmaine Williams
|
|Sara Singh
|
|Safdar Hussain
|
|Karitsa Tye
|
|Kathy Matusiak Costa
|
|
|
|
||
|Sara Singh
|-
| style="background:whitesmoke;"|Brampton East
||
|Hardeep Grewal
|
|Gurratan Singh
|
|Jannat Garewal
|
|Jamaal Blackwood
|
|Mike Bayer
|
|Paul Stark
|
|
||
|Gurratan Singh
|-
| style="background:whitesmoke;"|Brampton North
||
|Graham McGregor
|
|Sandeep Singh
|
|Harinder K Malhi
|
|Aneep Dhade
|
|Jerry Fussek
|
|Julia Bauman
|
|
||
|Kevin Yarde §
|-
| style="background:whitesmoke;"|Brampton South
||
|Prabmeet Singh Sarkaria
|
|Andria Barrett
|
|Marilyn Raphael
|
|Ines Espinoza
|
|Mike Mol
|
|
|
|Mehdi Pakzad (NOTA)
||
|Prabmeet Sarkaria
|-
| style="background:whitesmoke;"|Brampton West
||
|Amarjot Sandhu
|
|Navjit Kaur
|
|Rimmy Jhajj
|
|Pauline Thornham
|
|David Pardy
|
|Manjot Sekhon
|
|
||
|Amarjot Sandhu
|-
| style="background:whitesmoke;"|Mississauga Centre
||
|Natalia Kusendova
|
|Sarah Walji
|
|Sumira Malik
|
|Adriane Franklin
|
|Audrey Simpson
|
|Stephanie Wright
|
|Viktor Chornopyskyy (Mod.)Elie Diab (PPO)Greg Vezina (NOTA)
||
|Natalia Kusendova
|-
| style="background:whitesmoke;"|Mississauga East—Cooksville
||
|Kaleed Rasheed
|
|Khawar Hussain
|
|Dipika Damerla
|
|James Hea
|
|Mark Morrissey
|
|Gregory Tomchyshyn
|
|Wiktor Jachtholtz (Mod.)
||
|Kaleed Rasheed
|-
| style="background:whitesmoke;"|Mississauga—Erin Mills
||
|Sheref Sabawy
|
|Farina Hassan
|
|Imran Mian
|
|Michelle Angkasa
|
|Charles Wroblewski
|
|Laura E. Scarangella
|
|
||
|Sheref Sabawy
|-
| style="background:whitesmoke;"|Mississauga—Lakeshore
||
|Rudy Cuzzetto
|
|Julia Kole
|
|Elizabeth Mendes
|
|David Zeni
|
|Renata Cynarska
|
|George Cescon
|
|Brian Crombie (NOTA)
||
|Rudy Cuzzetto
|-
| style="background:whitesmoke;"|Mississauga—Malton
||
|Deepak Anand
|
|Waseem Ahmed
|
|Aman Gill
|
|Robert Chan
|
|Van Nguyen
|
|
|
|
||
|Deepak Anand
|-
| style="background:whitesmoke;"|Mississauga—Streetsville
||
|Nina Tangri
|
|Nicholas Rabba
|
|Jill Promoli
|
|Reead Rahamut
|
|Amir Kendic
|
|Christine Oliver

|
|Fourat Jajou (PPO)Len Little (NOTA)
||
|Nina Tangri
|}

York

|-
| style="background:whitesmoke;"|Aurora—Oak Ridges—Richmond Hill
||
|Michael Parsa
|
|Reza Pourzad
|
|Marjan Kasirlou
|
|Kevin Zheng
|
|Rosaria Wiseman
|
|Catherine Dellerba
|
|Igor Strelkov (Mod.)
||
|Michael Parsa
|-
| style="background:whitesmoke;"|King—Vaughan
||
|Stephen Lecce
|
|Samantha Sanchez
|
|Gillian Vivona
|
|Ren Guidolin
|
|Michael Di Mascolo
|
|Neil Killips
|
|Tatiana Babitch (Mod.)
||
|Stephen Lecce
|-
| style="background:whitesmoke;"|Markham—Stouffville
||
|Paul Calandra
|
|Kingsley Kwok
|
|Kelly Dunn
|
|Myles O’Brien
|
|Jennifer Gowland
|
|Michele Petit
|
|
||
|Paul Calandra
|-
| style="background:whitesmoke;"|Markham—Thornhill
||
|Logan Kanapathi
|
|Matthew Henriques
|
|Sandra Tam
|
|Zane Abulail
|
|Jennifer Gleason
|
|
|
|Mansoor Qureshi (CPO)
||
|Logan Kanapathi
|-
| style="background:whitesmoke;"|Markham—Unionville
||
|Billy Pang
|
|Senthil Mahalingam
|
|Emily Li
|
|Shanta Sundarason
|
|Trina Kollis
|
|Naz Obredor
|
|
||
|Billy Pang
|-
| style="background:whitesmoke;"|Newmarket—Aurora
||
|Dawn Gallagher Murphy
|
|Denis Heng
|
|Sylvain Roy
|
|Carolina Rodriguez
|
|Iwona Czarnecka
|
|Krista Mckenzie
|
|Yuri Duboisky (Mod.)
||
|Christine Elliott $
|-
| style="background:whitesmoke;"|Richmond Hill
||
|Daisy Wai
|
|Raymond Bhushan
|
|Roozbeh Farhadi
|
|Hasen Nicanfar
|
|Les Hoffman
|
|Ramtin Biouckzadeh
|
|Olga Rykova (Mod.)
||
|Daisy Wai
|-
| style="background:whitesmoke;"|Thornhill
||
|Laura Smith
| 
|Jasleen Kambo
|
|Laura Mirabella
|
|Daniella Mikanovsky
|
|Yakov Zarkhine
|
|Igor Tvorogov
|
|Jacob Joel Ginsberg (Ind.)Hiten Patel Roman Pesis (FPJ) Aleksei Polyakov (Mod.)Brandon Ying (Ind.)
||
|Gila Martow †
|-
| style="background:whitesmoke;"|Vaughan—Woodbridge
||
|Michael Tibollo
|
|Will McCarty
|
|Steven Del Duca
|
|Philip James Piluris
|
|Luca Mele
|
|Gerrard Fortin
|
|Mario Greco (PPO)Walid Omrani (Mod.)
||
|Michael Tibollo
|}

Toronto

Scarborough

|-
| style="background:whitesmoke;"|Scarborough—Agincourt
||
|Aris Babikian
|
|Benjamin Lee Truong
|
|Soo Wong
|
|Jacqueline Scott
|
|Rane Vega
|
|Donny Morgan
|
|
||
|Aris Babikian
|-
| style="background:whitesmoke;"|Scarborough Centre
||
|David Smith
|
|Neethan Shan
|
|Mazhar Shafiq
|
|Fatima Faruq
|
|Hidie Jaber
|
|Raphael Rosch
|
|Paul Beatty(Ind.)Serge Korovitsyn(Libert.)Kostadinos Stefanis(Ind.)Maria Tzvetanova(Mod.)
||
|Christina Mitas $
|-
| style="background:whitesmoke;"|Scarborough—Guildwood
|
|Alicia Vianga
|
|Veronica Javier
||
|Mitzie Hunter
|
|Dean Boulding
|
|Opa Hope Day
|
|William Moore
|
|Kevin Clarke(People)
||
|Mitzie Hunter
|-
| style="background:whitesmoke;"|Scarborough North
||
|Raymond Cho
|
|Justin Kong
|
|Anita Anandarajan
|
|Tara McMahon
|
|James Bountrogiannis
|
|Pete Grusys
|
|Mark Dickson(NOTA)
||
| Raymond Cho
|-
| style="background:whitesmoke;"|Scarborough—Rouge Park
||
|Vijay Thanigasalam
|
|Felicia Samuel
|
|Manal Abdullahi
|
|Priyan De Silva
|
|Christopher Bressi
|
|Gordon Kerr
|
|Matthew Oliver(FPO)
||
|Vijay Thanigasalam
|-
| style="background:whitesmoke;"|Scarborough Southwest
|
|Bret Snider
||
|Doly Begum
|
|Lisa Patel
|
|Cara Brideau
|
|Peter Naus
|
|Barbara Everatt
|
|James McNair(NOTA)Michelle Parsons(Ind.)
||
|Doly Begum
|}

North York

|-
| style="background:whitesmoke;"|Don Valley East
|
|Sam Moini
|
|Mara-Elena Nagy
||
|Adil Shamji
|
|Rizwan Khan
|
|Denyse Twagiramariya
|
|Donald McMullen
|
|
|
|Svetlozar Aleksiev(Mod.)Stella Kargiannakis(Ind.)Dimitre Popov(Consen.)Wayne Simmons(FPO)
||
|Vacant
|-
| style="background:whitesmoke;"|Don Valley North
||
|Vincent Ke
|
|Ebrahim Astaraki
|
|Jonathan Tsao
|
|Ostap Soroka
|
|Jay Sobel
|
|
|
|
|
|
||
|Vincent Ke
|-
|style="background:whitesmoke;"|Don Valley West
|
|Mark Saunders
|
|Irwin Elman
||
|Stephanie Bowman
|
|Sheena Sharp
|
|Laurel Hobbs
|
|Kylie Mc Allister
|
|
|
|John Kittredge (Libert.)John Kladitis(Ind.)Paul Reddick(Consen.)
||
|Kathleen Wynne †
|-
| style="background:whitesmoke;"|Eglinton—Lawrence
||
|Robin Martin
|
|Natasha Doyle-Merrick
|
|Arlena Hebert
|
|Leah Tysoe
|
|Erwin Sniedzins
|
|Lauren Dearing
|
|Bryant Thompson
|
|Jonathan Davis(PBP)Sam Kaplun(Ind.)Derek Sharp(PSN)
||
|Robin Martin
|-
| style="background:whitesmoke;"|Willowdale
||
|Stan Cho
|
|Hal David Berman
|
|Paul Saguil
|
|Monica Henriques
|
|Joanne Csillag
|
|Gian Pietro Arella
|
|Ben Barone
|
|Birinder Singh Ahluwalia(Ind.)Lilya Eklishaeva(FPJ)Jaime Rodriguez(PPO)Charles Roddy Sutherland(Ind.)
||
|Stan Cho
|-
| style="background:whitesmoke;"|York Centre
||
|Michael Kerzner
|
|Frank Chu
|
|Shelley Brown
|
|Alison Lowney
|
|Don Pincivero
|
|Nick Balaskas
|
|Mark Dewdney
|
|Parviz Isgandarov(Mod.)Lionel Wayne Poizner(PSN)
||
|Roman Baber †
|}

Central Toronto and East York

|-
| style="background:whitesmoke;"|Beaches—East York
|
|Angela Kennedy
|
|Kate Dupuis
||
|Mary-Margaret McMahon
|
|Abhijeet Manay
|
|Stephen Roney
|
|John Ferguson
|

|Drew Garvie (Comm.)Joe Ring(NOTA)Bahman Yazdanfar(CCP)
||
|Rima Berns-McGown $
|-
| style="background:whitesmoke;"|Davenport
|
|Paul Spence
||
|Marit Stiles
|
|Jerry Levitan
|
|Karen Stephenson
|
|Mario Bilusic
|
|Diti Coutinho
|
|Nicholas Alexander(Ind.)Jack Copple (Comm.)Simon Fogel(Ind.)Nunzio Venuto(Libert.)
||
|Marit Stiles
|-
| style="background:whitesmoke;"|Parkdale—High Park
|
|Monika Frejlich
||
|Bhutila Karpoche
|
|Karim Bardeesy
|
|Patrick Macklem
|
|Danielle Height
|
|Craig Peskett
|
|Gunes Agduk(Comm.)Oliver Roberts(People)
||
|Bhutila Karpoche
|-
| style="background:whitesmoke;"|Spadina—Fort York
|
|Husain Neemuchwala
||
|Chris Glover
|
|Chi Nguyen
|
|Cara Des Granges
|
|Angela Asher
|
|
|
|Jan Osko(SNSA)
||
|Chris Glover
|-
| style="background:whitesmoke;"|Toronto Centre
|
|Jessica Goddard
||
|Kristyn Wong-Tam
|
|David Morris
|
|Nicki Ward
|
|Steve Hoehlmann
|
|
|
|Ivan Byard (Comm.)Jennifer Snell(SNSA)Ron Shaw(NOTA)
||
|Suze Morrison $
|-
| style="background:whitesmoke;"|Toronto—Danforth
|
|Colleen McCleery
||
|Peter Tabuns
|
|Mary Fragedakis
|
|Marcelo Levy
|
|Milton Kandias
|
|George Simopoulos
|
|Christopher Brophy(NOTA)Jennifer Moxon (Comm.)
||
|Peter Tabuns
|-
| style="background:whitesmoke;"|Toronto—St. Paul's
|
|Blake Libfeld
||
|Jill Andrew
|
|Nathan Stall
|
|Ian Lipton
|
|Yehuda Goldberg
|
|Christian Ivanov Mihaylov
|
|Zoë Alexandra (PPO)Margarita Sharapova(Mod.)
||
|Jill Andrew
|-
| style="background:whitesmoke;"|University—Rosedale
|
|Carl Qiu
||
|Jessica Bell
|
|Andrea Barrack
|
|Dianne Saxe
|
|James Leventakis
|
|
|
|John Kanary(SNSA)
||
|Jessica Bell
|}

Etobicoke and York

|-
| style="background:whitesmoke;"|Etobicoke Centre
||
|Kinga Surma
|
|Heather Vickers-Wong
|
|Noel Semple
|
|Brian MacLean
|
|Cathy Habus
|
|Mitchell Gilboy
|
|Richard M. Kiernicki (NOTA)Genadij Zaitsev(Mod.)
||
|Kinga Surma
|-
| style="background:whitesmoke;"|Etobicoke—Lakeshore
||
|Christine Hogarth
|
|Farheen Alim
|
|Lee Fairclough
|
|Thomas Yanuziello
|
|Mary Markovic
|
|
|
|Bill Denning(Ind.)Vitas Naudziunas(NOTA)
||
|Christine Hogarth
|-
| style="background:whitesmoke;"|Etobicoke North
||
|Doug Ford
|
|Aisha Jahangir
|
|Julie Lutete
|
|Gabriel Blanc
|
|Victor Ehikwe
|
|Andy D'Andrea
|
|Carol Royer (People)
||
|Doug Ford
|-
| style="background:whitesmoke;"|Humber River—Black Creek
|
|Paul Nguyen
||
|Tom Rakocevic
|
|Ida Li Preti
|
|Keith Berry
|
|Iulian Caunei
|
|Lee Miguel Gonzalez
|
|Knia Singh(Ind.)
||
|Tom Rakocevic
|-
| style="background:whitesmoke;"|York South—Weston
||
|Michael Ford
|
|Faisal Hassan
|
|Nadia Guerrera
|
|Ignacio Mongrell Gonzalez
|
|Tom Hipsz
|
|Ana Gabriela Ortiz
|
|James Michael Fields(Ind.)
||
|Faisal Hassan
|}

Hamilton, Halton and Niagara

Halton

|-
| style="background:whitesmoke;"|Burlington
||
|Natalie Pierre
|
|Andrew Drummond
|
|Mariam Manaa
|
|Kyle Hutton
|
|Allison McKenzie
|
|Sebastian Aldea
|
|
||
|Jane McKenna $
|-
| style="background:whitesmoke;"|Milton
||
|Parm Gill
|
|Katherine Cirlincione
|
|Sameera Ali
|
|Oriana Knox
|
|John Spina
|
|
|
|Masood Khan(Consen.)
||
|Parm Gill
|-
| style="background:whitesmoke;"|Oakville
||
|Stephen Crawford
|
|Maeve McNaughton
|
|Alison Gohel
|
|Bruno Sousa
|
|Mark Fraser Platt
|
|Alicia Bedford
|
|Stephen Kenneth Crawford (NOTA)Andrew Titov(Mod.)Silvio Ursomarzo(FPO)
||
|Stephen Crawford
|-
| style="background:whitesmoke;"|Oakville North—Burlington
||
|Effie Triantafilopoulos
|
|Rhyan Vincent-Smith
|
|Kaniz Mouli
|
|Ali Hosny
|
|Doru Marin Gordan
|
|Jill Service
|
|
||
|Effie Triantafilopoulos
|}

Hamilton

|-
| style="background:whitesmoke;"|Flamborough—Glanbrook
||
|Donna Skelly
|
|Allison Cillis
|
|Melisse Willems
|
|Mario Portak
|
|Paul Simoes
|
|Walt Juchniewicz
|
|Nikita Mahood(PPO)
||
|Donna Skelly
|-
| style="background:whitesmoke;"|Hamilton Centre
|
|Sarah Bokhari
||
|Andrea Horwath
|
|Ekaterini Dimakis
|
|Sandy Crawley
|
|John Chroust
|
|Brad Peace
|
|Nigel Cheriyan (Comm.)Nathalie Xian Yi Yan(Ind.)
||
|Andrea Horwath
|-
| style="background:whitesmoke;"|Hamilton East—Stoney Creek
||
|Neil Lumsden
|
|Zaigham Butt
|
|Jason Farr
|
|Cassie Wylie
|
|Jeffery Raulino
|
|Domenic DiLuca
|
|Paul Miller(Ind.)Cameron Rajewski(ERP)
||
|Paul Miller
|-
| style="background:whitesmoke;"|Hamilton Mountain
|
|Michael Spadafora
||
|Monique Taylor
|
|Chantale Lachance
|
|Janet Errygers
|
|Baylee Nguyen
|
|Andy Busa
|
|
||
|Monique Taylor
|-
| style="background:whitesmoke;"|Hamilton West—Ancaster—Dundas
|
|Fred Bennink
||
|Sandy Shaw
|
|Shubha Sandill
|
|Syam Chandra
|
|Lee Weiss
|
|Frank Thiessen
|
|
||
|Sandy Shaw
|}

Niagara

|-
| style="background:whitesmoke;"|Niagara Centre
|
|Fred Davies
||
|Jeff Burch
|
|Terry Flynn
|
|Michelle McArthur
|
|Gary Dumelie
|
|Vincent Gircys
|
|
||
|Jeff Burch
|-
| style="background:whitesmoke;"|Niagara Falls
|
|Bob Gale
||
|Wayne Gates
|
|Ashley Waters
|
|Tommy Ward
|
|Christine Lewis-Napolitano
|
|Wesley Kavanagh
|
|Devon St. Denis-Richard(NOTA)
||
|Wayne Gates
|-
| style="background:whitesmoke;"|Niagara West
||
|Sam Oosterhoff
|
|Dave Augustyn
|
|Doug Joyner
|
|Laura Garner
|
|Chris Arnew
|
|Dan Dale
|
|Stefanos Karatopis(Libert.)Jim Torma (PPO)
||
|Sam Oosterhoff
|-
| style="background:whitesmoke;"|St. Catharines
|
|Sal Sorrento
||
|Jennie Stevens
|
|Ryan Madill
|
|Michele Braniff
|
|Keith McDonald
|
|Michael Goddard
|
|Judi Falardeau(Libert.)J. Justin O'Donnell(All)Rin Simon(Comm.)
||
|Jennie Stevens
|}

Midwestern Ontario

|-
| style="background:whitesmoke;"|Brantford—Brant
||
|Will Bouma
|
|Harvey Bischof
|
|Ruby Toor
|
|Karleigh Csordas
|
|Tad Brudzinski
|
|Allan Wilson
|
|Leslie Bory (CCP)Rob Ferguson (Libert.)John Turmel (Ind.)
||
|Will Bouma
|-
| style="background:whitesmoke;"|Cambridge
||
|Brian Riddell
|
|Marjorie Knight
|
|Surekha Shenoy
|
|Carla Johnson
|
|Belinda Karahalios
|
|
|
|
||
|Belinda Karahalios
|-
| style="background:whitesmoke;"|Guelph
|
|Peter McSherry
|
|James Parr
|
|Raechelle Devereaux
||
|Mike Schreiner
|
|Will Lomker
|
|
|
|Juanita Burnett (Comm.)Paul Taylor (NOTA)
||
|Mike Schreiner
|-
| style="background:whitesmoke;"|Haldimand—Norfolk
|
|Ken Hewitt
|
|Sarah Lowe
|
|Aziz Chouhdery
|
|Erik Coverdale
|
|Nate Hawkins
|
|Sheldon Simpson
||
|Bobbi Ann Brady (Ind.)George McMorrow (Ind.)Thecla Ross(FPO)
||
|Toby Barrett $
|-
| style="background:whitesmoke;"|Huron—Bruce
||
|Lisa Thompson
|
|Laurie Hazzard
|
|Shelley Blackmore
|
|Matthew Van Ankum
|
|Matt Kennedy
|
|Gerrie Huenemoerder
|
|Bruce Eisen(All)Ronald Stephens(Ind.)
||
|Lisa Thompson
|-
| style="background:whitesmoke;"|Kitchener Centre
|
|Jim Schmidt
||
|Laura Mae Lindo
|
|Kelly Steiss
|
|Wayne Mak
|
|Peter Beimers
|
|
|
|
||
|Laura Mae Lindo
|-
| style="background:whitesmoke;"|Kitchener—Conestoga
||
|Mike Harris Jr.
|
|Karen Meissner
|
|Melanie Van Alphen
|
|Nasir Abdulle
|
|Jim Karahalios
|
|Elisabeth Perrin Snyder
|
|Jason Adair(PPO)
||
|Mike Harris Jr.
|-
| style="background:whitesmoke;"|Kitchener South—Hespeler
||
|Jess Dixon
|
|Joanne Weston
|
|Ismail Mohamed
|
|David Weber
|
|John Teat
|
|David Gillies
|
|
||
|Amy Fee †
|-
| style="background:whitesmoke;"|Oxford
||
|Ernie Hardeman
|
|Lindsay Wilson
|
|Mary Holmes
|
|Cheryle Rose Baker
|
|Connie Oldenburger
|
|Karl Toews
|
|
||
|Ernie Hardeman
|-
| style="background:whitesmoke;"|Perth—Wellington
||
|Matthew Rae
|
|Jo-Dee Burbach
|
|Ashley Fox
|
|Laura Bisutti
|
|Bob Hosken
|
|Sandy William MacGregor
|
|Robby Smink (FPO)
||
|Randy Pettapiece $
|-
| style="background:whitesmoke;"|Waterloo
|
|Andrew Aitken
||
|Catherine Fife
|
|Jennifer Tuck
|
|Shefaza Esmail
|
|Vladimir Voznyuk
|
|Benjamin Hufnagel
|
|Peter House(ERP)Christian Shingiro (Comm.)
||
|Catherine Fife
|-
| style="background:whitesmoke;"|Wellington—Halton Hills
||
|Ted Arnott
|
|Diane Ballantyne
|
|Tom Takacs
|
|Ryan Kahro
|
|Stephen Kitras
|
|
|
|Ron Patava(Consen.)
||
|Ted Arnott
|}

Southwestern Ontario

|-
| style="background:whitesmoke;"|Chatham-Kent—Leamington
||
|Trevor Jones
|
|Brock McGregor
|
|
|
|Jennifer Surerus
|
|Rhonda Jubenville
|
|Rick Nicholls
|
|
||
|Rick Nicholls
|-
| style="background:whitesmoke;"|Elgin—Middlesex—London
||
|Rob Flack
|
|Andy Kroeker
|
|Heather Jackson
|
|Amanda Stark
|
|Matt Millar
|
|Brigitte Belton
|
|Malichi Malé(Consen.)Dave Plumb(FPO)
||
|Vacant
|-
| style="background:whitesmoke;"|Essex
||
|Anthony Leardi
|
|Ron LeClair
|
|Manpreet Brar
|
|Nicholas Wendler
|
|Danielle Sylvester
|
|Frank Causarano
|
|Kevin Linfield(NOTA)
||
|Taras Natyshak †
|-
| style="background:whitesmoke;"|Lambton—Kent—Middlesex
||
|Monte McNaughton
|
|Vanessa Benoit
|
|Bruce Baker
|
|Wanda Dickey
|
|David Barnwell
|
|Aaron Istvan Vegh
|
|Dean Eve(NOTA)
||
|Monte McNaughton
|-
| style="background:whitesmoke;"|London—Fanshawe
|
|Jane Kovarikova
||
|Teresa Armstrong
|
|Zeba Hashmi
|
|Zack Ramsey
|
|Adriana A. Medina
|
|Doug Macdonald
|
|Stephen R. Campbell(NOTA)Dave Durnin (FPO)T Paul Plumb(Consen.)
||
|Teresa Armstrong
|-
| style="background:whitesmoke;"|London North Centre
|
|Jerry Pribil
||
|Terence Kernaghan
|
|Kate Graham
|
|Carol Dyck
|
|Tommy Caldwell
|
|Darrel Grant
|
|George Le Mac(Consen.)Paul McKeever(FPO)
||
|Terence Kernaghan
|-
| style="background:whitesmoke;"|London West
|
|Paul Paolatto
||
|Peggy Sattler
|
|Vanessa Lalonde
|
|Colleen McCauley
|
|Kristopher Hunt
|
|Cynthia Workman
|
|Jacques Y Boudreau(Libert.)Brad Harness(Consen.)Mike McMullen(FPO)
||
|Peggy Sattler
|-
| style="background:whitesmoke;"|Sarnia—Lambton
||
|Bob Bailey
|
|Dylan Stelpstra
|
|Mark Russell
|
|Mason Bourdeau
|
|Keith Benn
|
|Ian Orchard
|
|Carla Olson(PPO)
||
|Bob Bailey
|-
| style="background:whitesmoke;"|Windsor—Tecumseh
||
|Andrew Dowie
|
|Gemma Grey-Hall
|
|Gary Kaschak
|
|Melissa Coulbeck
|
|Sophia Sevo
|
|Steven Gifford
|
|Giovanni Abati(Ind.)Nick Babic(Ind)Laura Chesnik(Ind.)David Sylvestre(NOTA)
||
|Percy Hatfield †
|-
| style="background:whitesmoke;"|Windsor West
|
|John Leontowicz
||
|Lisa Gretzky
|
|Linda L McCurdy
|
|Krysta Glovasky-Ridsdale
|
|Joshua Griffin
|
|Jeremy Palko
|
|
||
|Lisa Gretzky
|}

Northern Ontario

Northeastern Ontario

|-
| style="background:whitesmoke;"|Algoma—Manitoulin
|
|Cheryl Fort
||
|Michael Mantha
|
|Tim Vine
|
|Maria Legault
|
|Ron Koski
|
|Frederick Weening
|
|
||
|Michael Mantha
|-
| style="background:whitesmoke;"|Mushkegowuk—James Bay
|
|Eric Côté
||
|Guy Bourgouin
|
|Matthew Pronovost
|
|Catherine Jones
|
|Michael Buckley
|
|
|
|Fauzia Sadiq(PCRP)
||
|Guy Bourgouin
|-
| style="background:whitesmoke;"|Nickel Belt
|
|Randy Hazlett
||
|France Gélinas
|
|Gilles Proulx
|
|Glenys Babcock
|
|Melanie Savoie
|
|Willy Schneider
|
|
||
|France Gélinas
|-
| style="background:whitesmoke;"|Nipissing
||
|Vic Fedeli
|
|Erika Lougheed
|
|Tanya Vrebosch
|
|Sean McClocklin
|
|Taylor Russell
|
|Joe Jobin
|
|Michelle Lashbrook (Libert.)Giacomo Vezina(NOTA)
||
|Vic Fedeli
|-
| style="background:whitesmoke;"|Parry Sound—Muskoka
||
|Graydon Smith
|
|Erin Horvath
|
|
|
|Matt Richter
|
|Doug Maynard
|
||Andrew John Cocks
|
|Daniel Predie Jr.(Ind.)Brad Waddell (PPO)
||
|Norm Miller $
|-
| style="background:whitesmoke;"|Sault Ste. Marie
||
|Ross Romano
|
|Michele McCleave-Kennedy
|
|Liam Hancock
|
|Keagan Gilfillan
|
|S. Pankhurst
|
|
|
|Naomi Sayers(Ind.)
||
|Ross Romano
|-
| style="background:whitesmoke;"|Sudbury
|
|Marc Despatie
||
|Jamie West
|
|David Farrow
|
|David Robinson
|
|Sheldon Pressey
|
|Jason Laface
|
|Adrien Berthier(Libert.)J. David Popescu (Ind.)
||
|Jamie West
|-
| style="background:whitesmoke;"|Timiskaming—Cochrane
|
|Bill Foy
||
|John Vanthof
|
|Brian Johnson
|
|Kris Rivard
|
|Garry Andrade
|
|Geoffrey Aitchison
|
|Eric Cummings (Libert.)Jeff Wilkinson(NOTA)
||
|John Vanthof
|-
| style="background:whitesmoke;"|Timmins
||
|George Pirie
|
|Gilles Bisson
|
|
|
|Elizabeth Lockhard
|
|David Farrell
|
|
|
|Nadia Sadiq(PCRP)
||
|Gilles Bisson
|}

Northwestern Ontario

|-
| style="background:whitesmoke;"|Kenora—Rainy River
||
|Greg Rickford
|
|JoAnne Formanek Gustafson
|
|Anthony Leek
|
|Catherine Kiewning
|
|Kelvin Boucher-Chicago
|
|Larry Breiland
|
|Richard A. Jonasson
|
|Mi'Azhikwan(Ind.)
||
|Greg Rickford
|-
| style="background:whitesmoke;"|Kiiwetinoong
|
|Dwight Monck
||
|Sol Mamakwa
|
|Manuela Michelizzi
|
|Suzette A. Foster
|
|Alex Dornn
|
|
|
|
|
|
||
|Sol Mamakwa
|-
| style="background:whitesmoke;"|Thunder Bay—Atikokan
||
|Kevin Holland
|
|Judith Monteith-Farrell
|
|Rob Barrett
|
|Eric Arner
|
|David Tommasini
|
|Dan Criger
|
|
|
|Kenneth Jones(N. Ont)
||
|Judith Monteith-Farrell
|-
| style="background:whitesmoke;"|Thunder Bay—Superior North
|
|Peng You
||
|Lise Vaugeois
|
|Shelby Ch’ng
|
|Tracey Allison MacKinnon
|
|Katherine Suutari
|
|Stephen Hufnagel
|
|Adam Cherry
|
|Andy Wolff(N. Ont)
||
|Michael Gravelle
|}

References

Candidates in Ontario provincial elections